The Coldwater National Wildlife Refuge is located in northwest Mississippi,  south of the town of Crowder. These ponds are intensively managed for migrating waterfowl, shorebirds and wading birds. A majority of the refuge has been reforested in native bottomland hardwood species. Almost the entire refuge is flooded annually during the winter/spring by the Coldwater and Tallahatchie Rivers. Up to 50,000 migratory waterfowl winter on the refuge and 34 species of shorebirds have been recorded during spring and fall migration. Peregrine falcon, least tern, black tern, bald and golden eagles, and wood stork have been observed. Due to intensive management, the refuge is critically important as a sanctuary for waterfowl and other neotropical migratory birds. Primarily for these reasons, the refuge is closed to public access

References
Refuge website

National Wildlife Refuges in Mississippi
Protected areas of Quitman County, Mississippi
Protected areas of Tallahatchie County, Mississippi
Protected areas established in 2000